Madeley may refer to:

Places
 Madeley, Shropshire, a town, now part of the new town of Telford
 Madeley, Staffordshire, near Newcastle-under-Lyme
 Madeley, Western Australia,  a suburb of Perth, Australia

Other uses
 Madeley (surname)
 Madeley Wood Company, company
 Madeley Old Manor, medieval manor
 Madeley Old Hall, historic building
 Madeley High School

See also
 Madeley railway station (disambiguation), for all stations named Madeley
 Madely (disambiguation)
 Madley